Olena Oliinyk (born 3 May 1989) is a road cyclist from Ukraine. She represented her nation at the 2009 UCI Road World Championships.

References

External links 
 profile at Procyclingstats.com

1989 births
Ukrainian female cyclists
Living people
Place of birth missing (living people)
21st-century Ukrainian women